Ronald Henry Nixon (10 May 1898 – 14 November 1965), later known as Sri Krishna Prem or Sri Krishnaprem, was a British spiritual aspirant who went to India in the early 20th century. Together with his spiritual teacher Sri Yashoda Mai (1882 – 1944), he founded an ashram at Mirtola, near Almora, India. He was one of the first Europeans to pursue Vaishnavite Hinduism, and was highly regarded, with many Indian disciples. Later, according to the account of his foremost disciple Sri Madhava Ashish, Krishna Prem transcended the dogmas and practices of the Gaudiya Vaishnava tradition into which he had been initiated and affirmed a universal spiritual path shorn of "orthodoxy" and blind traditionalism.

Early life
Ronald Henry Nixon, more commonly called Ronald Nixon, was born in Cheltenham, England, in 1898, and educated in Taunton.
His mother was a Christian Scientist and his father was reportedly in the glass and china business.

At age 18, Nixon became a British fighter pilot in the First World War: he was commissioned as a temporary second lieutenant on probation on 10 May 1917, was confirmed in his rank on 12 June, and was appointed a flying officer in the Royal Flying Corps on 15 June. On one occasion, he experienced an escape from death that he believed was miraculous, in which a "power beyond our ken" saved him from several enemy planes. His experiences of death and destruction during the war filled him with a "sense of futility and meaninglessness". He was transferred to the unemployed list of the Royal Air Force on 11 January 1919 and relinquished his temporary Army commission on 3 December that year.

After the war, Nixon enrolled in King's College, Cambridge, where he studied English literature. During this period Nixon also studied philosophy, and became acquainted with Theosophy, Advaita Vedanta Hinduism, Buddhism, and Pali, and developed an interest in going to India to learn more about the practical aspects of Indian religion.

Life in India
In 1921, while still in England, Nixon accepted the offer of a teaching position at the University of Lucknow, in northern India. As it turned out, the university's vice-chancellor, Gyanendra Nath Chakravarti, was also spiritually inclined and interested in Theosophy, and offered Nixon assistance.
Over time, Nixon came to regard Gyanendra's wife, Monica Devi Chakravarti, as his spiritual teacher. 
In 1928, Monika took vows of renunciation in the Gaudiya Vaishnavite tradition, where these vows are called vairagya. She adopted the monastic name of Sri Yashoda Mai. Soon thereafter, she initiated Nixon into vairagya, and he adopted Krishna Prem as his monastic name.

In 1930, Sri Yashoda Mai and Krishna Prem together founded an ashram at Mirtola, near Almora, in mountainous north-central India (state of Uttarakhand). The ashram "began and has continued to be" aligned with strict orthodox Vaishnavism. In 1944, Yashoda Ma died and Krishna Prem succeeded her as head of the ashram. He travelled little, but in 1948 he visited South India, meeting Sri Ramana Maharshi, as well as Sri Aurobindo and Mirra Alfassa ("The Mother"). 
Sardella states that Nixon appears to have been "the first European to embrace Vaishnavism in India". 
Haberman states that Nixon "was perhaps the first Westerner to tread the path of Krishna-bhakti, and was certainly the first to have any official affiliation with the Gaudiya Vaishnavism of Braj."

Krishna Prem, despite his English origins, became widely accepted and admired in the Indian Hindu community.  Brooks wrote that "Krishna Prem's evident intellectual and inspirational qualities gained him wide fame and many disciples in India, as reflected in numerous books on his life and teachings."
Gertrude Emerson Sen wrote that "I know of no other person like Krishnaprem, himself 'foreign' to begin with, who has drawn so many Indians to himself".
His biographer Dilip Kumar Roy wrote that Krishnaprem "had given a filip [stimulus] to my spiritual aspiration".

Haberman wrote that Krishna Prem "was recognized as a Hindu saint by many Indians of his day." When Nixon died in 1965, he was hailed by Sarvepalli Radhakrishnan, then president of India, as a "great soul".  Nixon's final words were "my ship is sailing".

Works
 
 (194 pages) (original edition 1938)
  (224 pages)
  (128 pages)
  (360 pages)
 (264 pages)
 (138 pages) 
 (111 pages)

Biographical sources

 (312 pages) (original edition, 1968)
"The Case of Sri Krishna Prem" in 

 
"Krishna Prem, Sri (1898–1965) Western-born Vaishnavite Guru" in 
"Sri Krishna Prem (Ronald Nixon)" in 
"Sri Krishna Prem / Ronald Nixon" in 
"Sri Yashoda Ma 1882–1944" (chapter 20) in

References

External links
Photograph of Krishna Prem (Ronald Nixon)

1898 births
1965 deaths
People from Cheltenham
English emigrants to India
Converts to Hinduism
Indian spiritual writers
Hindu spiritual teachers
Indian Hindu monks
Royal Flying Corps officers
British Army personnel of World War I
Alumni of King's College, Cambridge
Academic staff of the University of Lucknow
Gaudiya Vaishnavism
British World War I pilots